Serbian League Belgrade (Serbian: Српска лига Београд / Srpska liga Beograd) is one of four sections of the Serbian League, the third national tier. The other three sections are Serbian League East, Serbian League Vojvodina and Serbian League West.

Seasons

Members clubs (2022–23) 
The following 16 clubs compete in the Serbian League Belgrade during the 2022–23 season.

References

External links
 Football Association of Serbia
 Football Association of Belgrade

 
Belgrade
Football in Belgrade